Darijan Matić (born 28 May 1983) is a Slovenian professional football manager and former player.

Honours
Interblock
Slovenian Cup: 2007–08, 2008–09
Slovenian Supercup: 2008

Olimpija Ljubljana
Slovenian First League: 2015–16

See also
Slovenian international players

References

External links
 
 
 NZS profile 

1983 births
Living people
Footballers from Ljubljana
Slovenian footballers
Association football midfielders
NK IB 1975 Ljubljana players
NK Triglav Kranj players
NK Ljubljana players
FC Koper players
NK Olimpija Ljubljana (1945–2005) players
NK Domžale players
FC Shinnik Yaroslavl players
PFC Spartak Nalchik players
FC Rapid București players
Bnei Sakhnin F.C. players
FC Kryvbas Kryvyi Rih players
NK Olimpija Ljubljana (2005) players
NŠ Mura players
Slovenian expatriate footballers
Slovenian PrvaLiga players
Slovenian Second League players
Russian Premier League players
Liga I players
Israeli Premier League players
Ukrainian Premier League players
Slovenian expatriate sportspeople in Russia
Slovenian expatriate sportspeople in Romania
Slovenian expatriate sportspeople in Israel
Slovenian expatriate sportspeople in Ukraine
Slovenian expatriate sportspeople in Austria
Expatriate footballers in Russia
Expatriate footballers in Romania
Expatriate footballers in Israel
Expatriate footballers in Ukraine
Expatriate footballers in Austria
Slovenia youth international footballers
Slovenia under-21 international footballers
Slovenia international footballers
Slovenian football managers
NK Krško managers